Avalon Waterways is a river cruise company owned by the Globus family of brands and offers cruises in Europe, China, Southeast Asia, South America, India and the Galápagos Islands.  The company became a member of Cruise Lines International Association (CLIA) in August 2009.

History and ship design
Avalon Waterways started operations in 2004 with just one initial ship, called Avalon Artistry. The following year, the company added the Avalon Poetry to its fleet. 
 
As of 2019, the company operates ships on the Danube, Rhine, Moselle, Rhone, Seine and Saone in Europe; The Mekong River in Southeast Asia, as well as on the Yangtze (in China), the Ganges (in India) and the Amazon River (in Peru).

Avalon Waterways has earned river cruise operator awards including "Best European river line" in 2019.

Fleet
Since its launch in 2004, Avalon Waterways has christened 23 new ships in Europe and three new ships in Southeast Asia.

Special interest cruises
Avalon has offered a range of special interest cruises including culinary-, beer- and Christmas-themed itineraries.

Godmothers
Godmothers of its ships in Europe have included Eat, Pray, Love author Elizabeth Gilbert, Outlander author Diana Gabaldon, singer/songwriter Jann Arden, 1,000 Places to See Before You Die author Patricia Schultz and U.S. Women’s National Team coach Jill Ellis.

References

External links 

 

Avalon Waterways
Group Voyagers
Cruise lines
River cruise ships
Hospitality companies of Switzerland
Hospitality companies established in 2004
Swiss companies established in 2004